Voskresenovka is a rural locality (a selo) in Kursky Selsoviet, Kulundinsky District, Altai Krai, Russia. The population was 144 as of 2013. There are 2 streets.

Geography 
Voskresenovka is located 18 km south of Kulunda (the district's administrative centre) by road. Kursk is the nearest rural locality.

References 

Rural localities in Kulundinsky District